Georgi Donkov (born 2 June 1970) is a Bulgarian former professional footballer who played as a forward.

Club career
In his career Donkov played for Levski Sofia, Botev Plovdiv and CSKA Sofia. He played also in Germany for VfL Bochum, 1. FC Köln, SC Paderborn 07, SV Waldhof Mannheim and FSV Oggersheim, in Switzerland with Neuchâtel Xamax, and in Cyprus for Enosis Paralimni.

International career
Donkov was a member of the Bulgaria national team with which he participated at Euro 1996.

Coaching career
Donkov started his coaching career in the summer 2010, where he was appointed assistant coach under manager Mario Basler at Wacker Burghausen. On 14 May 2011, after manager Basler was fired, Donkov was named caretaker manager until the end of the season. Donkov continued as assistant coach, after a manager was hired during the summer break. In May 2012, after Reinhard Stumpf was fired, Donkov was once again named caretaker manager until the end of the season and later signed a permanent deal as the clubs new manager. Donkov was fired in September 2013.

International goals
Scores and results list Bulgaria's goal tally first, score column indicates score after each Donkov goal.

Coaching career
On 9 June 2010, Donkov was named as the new assistant coach of 3. Liga club SV Wacker Burghausen. He became the assistant coach of his country's national football team in October 2016.

Honours
Levski Sofia
 Bulgarian A PFG: 1988, 1993
 Bulgarian Cup: 1991, 1992
 Cup of the Soviet Army: 1988

References

External links
 
 Profile at LevskiSofia.info

Living people
1970 births
Footballers from Sofia
Bulgarian footballers
Association football forwards
Bulgaria international footballers
PFC Levski Sofia players
Botev Plovdiv players
PFC CSKA Sofia players
VfL Bochum players
1. FC Köln players
Neuchâtel Xamax FCS players
Enosis Neon Paralimni FC players
SC Paderborn 07 players
SV Waldhof Mannheim players
FSV Oggersheim players
UEFA Euro 1996 players
First Professional Football League (Bulgaria) players
Bundesliga players
2. Bundesliga players
Swiss Super League players
Cypriot First Division players
Bulgarian football managers
3. Liga managers
SV Wacker Burghausen managers
SSV Reutlingen 05 managers
Bulgarian expatriate footballers
Bulgarian expatriate football managers
Bulgarian expatriate sportspeople in Germany
Expatriate footballers in Germany
Expatriate football managers in Germany
Bulgarian expatriate sportspeople in Switzerland
Expatriate footballers in Switzerland
Bulgarian expatriate sportspeople in Cyprus
Expatriate footballers in Cyprus